Eureiandra balfourii is a species of plant in the family Cucurbitaceae. It is endemic to Yemen.  Its natural habitat is subtropical or tropical dry forests.

References

Endemic flora of Socotra
balfourii
Vulnerable plants
Taxonomy articles created by Polbot
Taxa named by Isaac Bayley Balfour
Taxa named by Alfred Cogniaux